Agustín Juárez (born 28 August 1943) is a Mexican former cyclist. He competed in the individual road race at the 1968 Summer Olympics.

References

External links
 

1943 births
Living people
Mexican male cyclists
Olympic cyclists of Mexico
Cyclists at the 1968 Summer Olympics
People from San Luis Potosí City
20th-century Mexican people
21st-century Mexican people
Sportspeople from San Luis Potosí